The Luweero Triangle, sometimes spelled Luwero Triangle, is an area of Uganda north of the capital Kampala, where, in 1981, Yoweri Museveni started the guerrilla war that propelled him and his National Resistance Movement into power in 1986. 

The area was notorious for the persecution of civilians during the Luweero War, between the rebel National Resistance Army and the government of Milton Obote. Many residents were either forcibly recruited or killed by both sides during the five-year Ugandan Bush War, as Museveni's guerrilla forces started their advance from Kyankwanzi southeast toward Kampala. The following Buganda districts constitute the Luweero Triangle:

 Kiboga District
 Kyankwanzi District, formerly part of Kiboga
 Nakaseke District, formerly part of Luweero
 Nakasongola District, formerly part of Luweero
 Luweero District
 Mubende District
 Mityana District, formerly part of Mubende
 Wakiso District, formerly part of Mpigi

See also
 Luweero District

References

Luweero District
Geography of Uganda